Acerbiella is a genus of fungi within the class Sordariomycetes. The relationship of this taxon to other taxa within the class is unknown (incertae sedis).

References

Sordariomycetes enigmatic taxa
Sordariomycetes genera